Antonio Spinelli, C.R. (1657 – October 1724) was a Roman Catholic prelate who served as Bishop of Melfi e Rapolla (1697–1724).

Biography
Antonio Spinelli was born in Aquaro Feudo, Italy in 1657 and ordained a priest in the Congregation of Clerics Regular of the Divine Providence.
On 2 December 1697, he was appointed during the papacy of Pope Innocent XII as Bishop of Melfi e Rapolla.
On 8 December 1697, he was consecrated bishop by Baldassare Cenci (seniore), Archbishop of Fermo, with Prospero Bottini, Titular Archbishop of Myra, and Sperello Sperelli, Bishop of Terni, serving as co-consecrators. 
He served as Bishop of Melfi e Rapolla until his death in October 1724.

Episcopal succession
While bishop, Spinelli was the principal co-consecrator of:
Francesco Acquaviva d'Aragona, Titular Archbishop of Larissa in Thessalia (1697); and
Giulio Piazza, Titular Archbishop of Rhodus (1697).

References

External links and additional sources
 (for Chronology of Bishops) 
 (for Chronology of Bishops) 

17th-century Italian Roman Catholic bishops
18th-century Italian Roman Catholic bishops
1657 births
1724 deaths
Bishops appointed by Pope Innocent XII
Theatine bishops